Progress M-35 was a Russian unmanned Progress cargo spacecraft, which was launched in July 1997 to resupply the Mir space station.

Launch
Progress M-35 launched on 5 July 1997 from the Baikonur Cosmodrome in Kazakhstan. It used a Soyuz-U rocket.

Docking
Progress M-35 docked with the aft port of the Kvant-1 module of Mir on 7 July 1997 at 05:59:24 UTC, and was undocked on 6 August 1997 at 11:46:45 UTC, to make way for Soyuz TM-26. Following a redocking of Soyuz TM-26 to the forward port of the Mir Core Module, Progress M-35 was redocked at the Kvant-1 aft port on 18 August 1997 at 12:52:48 UTC. Progress M-35 was finally undocked on 7 October 1997 at 12:03:47 UTC.

Decay
It remained in orbit until 7 October 1997, when it was deorbited. The deorbit burn occurred at 16:41 UTC, with the mission ending at 17:23 UTC.

See also

 1997 in spaceflight
 List of Progress missions
 List of uncrewed spaceflights to Mir

References

Progress (spacecraft) missions
1997 in Kazakhstan
Spacecraft launched in 1997
Spacecraft which reentered in 1997
Spacecraft launched by Soyuz-U rockets